The 2001 Salem Open was a men's tennis tournament played on outdoor hard courts in Hong Kong, China and was part of the International Series of the 2001 ATP Tour. The tournament ran from September 24 through September 30, 2001. Marcelo Ríos won the singles title.

Finals

Singles

 Marcelo Ríos defeated  Rainer Schüttler 7–6(7–3), 6–2
 It was Ríos' 2nd title of the year and the 19th of his career.

Doubles

 Karsten Braasch /  André Sá defeated  Petr Luxa /  Radek Štěpánek 6–0, 7–5
 It was Braasch's 2nd title of the year and the 3rd of his career. It was Sá's only title of the year and the 1st of his career.

Salem Open
Hong Kong Open (tennis)
2001 in Hong Kong sport
2001 in Chinese tennis